Tauragė District Municipality is a municipality in Tauragė County, Lithuania

Seniūnijos (Elderships or Wards) 
The Tauragė district municipality contains 8 seniūnijos (in English: elderships or wards); the main town or village is listed for each.

  – Batakiai
  – Gaurė
  – 
  – 
  – Skaudvilė
  – Tauragė
  – Tauragė
  – Žygaičiai

Population by locality

Status: M, MST – city, town / K, GST – village / VS – steading

References 

Municipalities of Tauragė County
Municipalities of Lithuania